Pieck is a Dutch surname. Notable people with the surname include:
Adri Pieck (1894–1982), Dutch artist
Anton Pieck (1895–1987), Dutch painter, artist and graphic artist
Arthur Pieck (1899–1970), Communist Party of Germany politician
Gretha Pieck (1898–1920), Dutch artist
Henri Pieck (1895–1972), Dutch architect, painter and graphic artist
Nicholas Pieck (1534–1572), Dutch Roman Catholic saint
Wilhelm Pieck (1876–1960), German communist politician

Dutch-language surnames